, born , also as Bekki Akitsura, and Bekki Dōsetsu, was a Japanese samurai of the Sengoku period who served the Ōtomo clan. He was the father of Tachibana Ginchiyo and adopted father of Tachibana Muneshige.

Dōsetsu was born in Yoroigatake Castle, Bungo Province. He led an attack at Tachibana Castle and took both their castle and clan. In 1571, he become the head of Tachibana clan, and changed his name, becoming Tachibana Dōsetsu. He was known as one of the wisest of the Ōtomo retainers and is remembered in part for a letter he sent other leading Ōtomo retainers that included a condemnation of the spread of Christianity in the Ōtomo's domain. Under Otomo Sorin, Dōsetsu fought at Siege of Moji (1561) and Battle of Tatarahama (1569). He was one of Sorin's greatest vassals and, as the keeper of the Tachibana Castle, he was responsible for the defense of the Bungo's northwestern reaches.

Dōsetsu was in possession of a famous sword called 'Chidori' (千鳥, (A) Thousand Birds). One day, while he was still a young man, he was taking shelter under a tree, as it was raining. Suddenly, a bolt of lightning struck him. However, Dōsetsu used his Chidori to cut the Thunder God inside the lightning bolt, allowing him to survive. After this incident, he renamed his 'Chidori' to 'Raikiri' (雷切, Lightning Cutter).

He fought in 37 battles while about half of his body was paralyzed. It was for this he was known as 'Oni Dōsetsu'. He died while leading an attack on Neko'o Castle, Chikugo Province in 1585. An account cited that while fighting together with Takahashi Shōsetsu, he fought using the hōen formation, which included six ranks of arquebusiers and two ranks of bows to fend off attacks. In this battle, Shōsetsu used the kōyaku defense.

Further reading
Nishizu Hiromi (1998). Honō no gunsen Tachibana Dōsetsu 炎の軍扇立花道雪. (Tokyo: Sōbunsha).

In popular culture
In the popular anime series Naruto, there are techniques named “Chidori” and “Raikiri”. To reference the story of Dōsetsu, a major character named Kakashi Hatake uses one of these techniques to cut a bolt of lightning in half.

In the anime series Katana Maidens, Chidori is the sword used by the main character, Eto Kanami.

Tachibana appears in the video game Samurai Warriors 2: Empires as a generic officer.

Tachibana is mentioned in the description of the Raikiri, which is usable in the fantasy RPG Nioh.

See also
Battle of Tatarahama (1569)
Siege of Tachibana
Shigashi

References

Samurai
Daimyo
1513 births
1585 deaths
Tachibana clan
Japanese Buddhist clergy
Deified Japanese people
People from Ōita Prefecture